Etna or Etne is a river in the Valdres region of Innlandet county, Norway. Soon after the confluence of those two rivers, they join the Randsfjorden (a long, narrow inland lake).

The river begins near the mountains Skaget and Langsua inside the Langsua National Park. It then flows in a southerly direction. Much of the river runs through the Etnedalen valley (the namesake of the municipality of Etnedal). The river runs through the village of Bruflat and then shortly after this, it begins heading in a more easterly direction. The river was formally protected from hydropower development by the government in 1993.

See also
List of rivers in Norway

References

Etnedal
Nordre Land
Rivers of Innlandet